Introduce Us to Immortality is the first compilation album by extreme progressive metal band Kekal. It is a best-of collection of works and re-recordings by the band dating from 1995 to 2003. Several tracks were digitally re-mastered at 24-bit processing, and two of the tracks were previously unreleased. The album included a full-color professional booklet cover, which contained a history of the band's progression from their first demo to their latest full-length album 1000 Thoughts of Violence. According to the band, the purpose of the album was to give fans of the band a chance to hear earlier Kekal material, much of which was sold out.

Track listing

References

Kekal compilation albums
2003 compilation albums